Kathleen A. Miller  is a climate scientist who specializes in the economics of climate change and its effects on institutions, management of risk and investment decisions.

Education and career 
Miller has a B.A. (1974), M.A. (1976), and a Ph.D (1985) from the University of Washington.

Miller undertook her doctorate in Economics at the University of Washington in 1985. Her dissertation was entitled The Right to Use vs. the Right to Sell: Water Rights in the Western United States. It explored the evolution of property institutions governing access to water in the arid western states and modelled the operation and effects of these institutions in the presence of both scarcity and inter-temporal variability in water supplies.

Career

She joined the staff at the National Center for Atmospheric Research in Colorado in 1985 as a Scientist I and was promoted to Scientist III in 1993.

Miller has worked on multiple chapters in the Assessment Review reports from the Intergovernmental Panel on Climate Change. and Miller contributed to the IPCC report that was awarded the 2007 Nobel Peace Prize. Specifically she was one of two coordinating lead authors on the chapter on North America in the report Climate Change 2001: Impacts, Adaptations and Vulnerability.and one of the lead authors on the technical summary. For the 2007 IPCC report she was one of eight lead authors on Chapter 3: Freshwater resources and their management.

Bibliography













References

External links

American atmospheric scientists
Women atmospheric scientists
American earth scientists
Women earth scientists
21st-century American economists
American women economists
Water privatization
Privatization in the United States
Year of birth missing (living people)
University of Washington alumni
National Center for Atmospheric Research faculty
Intergovernmental Panel on Climate Change lead authors
Living people
21st-century American women scientists